Steve Koonin (born June 6, 1957) is the chief executive officer of the Atlanta Hawks and State Farm Arena. He is the former president of Turner Broadcasting System. Koonin chairs the Georgia Aquarium and is on the boards of World Wrestling Entertainment, Rubicon Technologies, Fox Theatre, Metro Atlanta Chamber of Commerce, Emory Healthcare, and the Woodruff Arts Center.

Early life and education
Koonin was born in 1957 in Atlanta, Georgia. He studied marketing at the University of Georgia. Koonin is of Jewish descent.

Career

Coca Cola Company
Koonin spent more than a decade at The Coca Cola Company. While serving as Coca Cola's VP of sports and entertainment marketing, Koonin was honored as the SportsBusiness Journal Sports Executive of the Year.

Turner Broadcasting System
He worked at Turner Broadcasting System for over 14 years, and served as the organization's president.

Atlanta Hawks
In April 2014, the Atlanta Hawks hired Koonin as CEO of the Atlanta Hawks & State Farm Arena.

By the end of 2015, the Hawks organization built 25 community basketball courts over five years in disadvantaged communities across the city of Atlanta. During the COVID-19 pandemic, the Atlanta Hawks leveraged partnerships with Emory Healthcare to provide thousands of meals weekly for workers on the front lines. In June 2020, Atlanta Hawks were the first NBA team to commit their arena for use as a polling site – the largest voting center in the state of Georgia – during the 2020 election.

Boards and accolades
Koonin serves as the chairman for the Georgia Aquarium. He is on the boards of World Wrestling Entertainment, Rubicon Technologies, Fox Theatre, Metro Atlanta Chamber of Commerce, Emory Healthcare, and the Woodruff Arts Center. Koonin was a former member of the board of GameStop, resigning in 2020.

Koonin has been listed on Atlanta Magazine’s 55 Most Powerful People shaping Atlanta, Atlanta Business Chronicle's 100 Most Influential Atlantans, and Georgia Trend's 100 Most Influential Georgians. Atlanta Sports Council awarded Koonin a Lifetime Achievement Award in 2020.

Personal life
Koonin is married to Eydie Koonin, an Atlanta-based real estate agent. They have two children: David Koonin, a sports media agent with Creative Artists Agency, and Amy Beth Koonin Taylor. In 2013, Steve and his wife Eydie created the Koonin Scholars Fund at the Grady College of Journalism and Mass Communication which provides scholarships for students.

See also
List of National Basketball Association team presidents

References

1957 births
Living people
National Basketball Association executives
University of Georgia alumni
American people of Jewish descent